Lucht is a surname. Notable people with the surname include:

David A. Lucht (born 1943), American engineer and fire safety advocate
Ed Lucht (born 1931), Canadian basketball player
Ernst Lucht (1896–1975), German admiral
Hannelore Lucht, German chess master
Walter Lucht (1882–1949), German general